Cranor School, in a rural area near St. Charles, Kentucky, was built in 1914.  It was listed on the National Register of Historic Places in 1989.  It is a one-story gable-front frame building.  A combination coal shed and privy stands to the rear of the property.  After the building was sold by the school system in the 1940s, it was used as community center and church.

References

School buildings on the National Register of Historic Places in Kentucky
School buildings completed in 1914
Schools in Hopkins County, Kentucky
1914 establishments in Kentucky
Kit houses
National Register of Historic Places in Hopkins County, Kentucky